Ciliopagurus plessisi is a species of hermit crab native to French Polynesia.

References

Hermit crabs
Crustaceans described in 1995